Hadiza Zakari (born 26 September 1989) is a Nigerian fashion Model, entrepreneur and beauty pageant contestant weightlifter.

Career 
Hadiza Zakari started her career when she joined the Nigerian Security and Civil Defence Corps (NSCDC) as a serving member she get into weightlifting and became one of the best Nigerian national weightlifters in local competitions. She first competed at International level during the 2009 World Championships in the 75 kg category where she finished twelve in snatch, thirteen in clean and jerk, and thirteen overall. At the 2010 Commonwealth Games she won a gold medal in the 75 kg event with a 110 kg snatch and a 140 clean and jerk for a combined total of 239 kg, a Commonwealth Games record at time.

She also competed in the 2011 World Championships in the 75 kg category she finished eleven in snatch, six in clean and jerk, and eleven overall.

References 

1987 births
Living people
Nigerian female weightlifters
Commonwealth Games gold medallists for Nigeria
Commonwealth Games medallists in weightlifting
Weightlifters at the 2010 Commonwealth Games
World Weightlifting Championships medalists
20th-century Nigerian women
21st-century Nigerian women
Medallists at the 2010 Commonwealth Games